The Austro Engine EA50R is an Austrian aircraft engine, produced by Austro Engine of Wiener Neustadt for use in motorgliders and UAVs.

Design and development
The AE50R is based on the MidWest AE50. Diamond Aircraft Industries purchased the design from Mid-West Engines Limited on 10 March 2003 and took over as the type certificate holder. Diamond formed its subsidiary, Austro Engine, to produce the engine.

The engine is a single rotor four-stroke, air and liquid-cooled,  gasoline Wankel engine design, with a mechanical gearbox reduction drive employing a helical gear set with a reduction ratio of 3.225:1. Cooling is predominantly liquid, with forced air cooling for the rotor core. A starter and generator are standard equipment. It employs dual capacitor discharge ignition with variable ignition timing and produces  at 7750 rpm.

The engine was originally type certified by Mid-West on 18 Dec 1992 to JAR-22 H, Change 4, dated 13 September 1982, incl. Orange Paper 22/90/1. It was transferred to an EASA Type Certificate under EASA Part 22 Subpart H on 4 April 2011.

Variants
AE50R
Base version, certified 18 December 1992
AE50RA
Version equipped with a conventional dual ignition system and a carburettor, with differing engine attachment point geometry, certified 26 September 2001
AE50RAB
Version equipped with a conventional dual ignition system and a carburettor, with differing engine attachment point geometry, certified 26 September 2001
IAE50R-AA

Applications
Schiebel Camcopter S-100
Schleicher ASG 32
Schleicher ASH 30
Schleicher ASH 31

Specifications (AE50R)

See also

References

External links

Austro Engine aircraft engines
Aircraft Wankel engines